Cheilosia variabilis, common name figwort cheilosia, is a species of hoverfly belonging to the family Syrphidae.

Distribution
This species is native to the Palearctic realm, present in most of Europe eastwards to western Siberia, in the Near East, and in North Africa.

Habitat
These hoverflies inhabit deciduous forest, from the Fagus, Picea zone to alluvial hardwood forest, tracksides and edges of clearings.

Description

For terms see Morphology of Diptera
Like most Cheilosia this large species is blackish, and because of this colour it may often be overlooked as a hoverfly. Face has outstanding hairs on the sides and a conspicuous central knob. Antennae are black or dark brown and hairs of arista are longer than diameter of basal part. Thorax is black-haired. Abdomen is rather elongate and tergites are pale yellow-haired. Wings are greyish and disproportionately long. Legs are entirely black. In males halteres are pale brown. 
 
 The larva is figured by Dusek (1962).

This species is rather similar to Cheilosia lasiopa, Cheilosia vulpina and Cheilosia griseiventris.

Biology
Adult hoverflies can be found from April to September in two generations per year, as this species is bivoltine. They visit flowers of white umbellifers, Aegopodium podagraria, Alliaria petiolata, Anthriscus sylvestris, Apiaceae, Aurinia saxatilis, Conium maculatum, Crataegus laevigata, Euphorbia cyparissias, Meum athamanticum, Potentilla reptans, Ranunculus repens, Salix spec., Sambucus nigra, Caltha, Cirsium, Galium, Scrophularia, Sorbus aucuparia.

The larvae are miners in the rhizomes of the common figwort (Scrophularia nodosa) (hence the common name)  and in the stalks of the water figwort (Scrophularia auriculata).

References

External links
Boldy Systems
 Flickr Photos
 Stuart Ball, Roger Morris Britain's Hoverflies: A Field Guide - Revised and Updated Second Edition

Diptera of Europe
Eristalinae
Insects described in 1798
Articles containing video clips